Trichophysetis neophyla is a moth of the family Crambidae. It was described by Edward Meyrick in 1884 and is known from Australia.

The wingspan is about 12 mm. The wings have fine dark and light bars giving a silvery-grey appearance, as well as some wavy brown and olive-green markings. When at rest, it has an unusual curved posture with the wing tips near the surface and abdomen held away from the surface.

References

Cybalomiinae
Moths of Australia